is a train station in Kuriyama, Yūbari District, Hokkaidō, Japan.

Lines
Kuriyama Station is served by the Muroran Main Line.

Station layout
The station has two ground-level opposed side platforms serving two tracks. Kitaca is not available.

Platforms

Adjacent stations

Surrounding area

 
 Yūbari River

References

Railway stations in Hokkaido Prefecture
Railway stations in Japan opened in 1893